This is a list of the kings of Dál Riata, a kingdom of Irish origin which was located in Scotland and Ireland. Most kings of Dál Riata, along with later rulers of Alba and of Scotland, traced their descent from Fergus Mór mac Eirc, and even in the 16th century, James VI of Scotland called himself the "happie monarch sprung of Ferguse race".

Background
It is not until the middle of the 6th century that Irish annals plausibly report the deaths of kings of Dál Riata, with the death of Comgall mac Domangairt, c. 538–545, and of his brother Gabrán, c. 558–560. After the disastrous Battle of Moira (Mag Rath) in 637, Irish Dál Riata lost possession of its Scottish lands. During the 8th century, the rival Dál nAraidi had overrun Irish Dál Riata, though the area retained its name well into the 14th century.

The last attested king of Scottish Dál Riata is Fergus mac Echdach, brother of and successor to Áed Find, whose death is reported in the Annals of Ulster in 781. Dál Riata was divided into a number of kingroups or dynasties, called cenéla, among which was the Cenél nGabráin of Kintyre, who claimed descent from Gabrán mac Domangairt, and the Cenél Loairn, who claimed descent from Loarn mac Eirc. While the Irish origin of the Kings of Dál Riata is unquestionable, the links to the Irish nobility were likely exaggerated in later centuries to claim foundership of the kingdom in an effort to add legitimacy to the dynasties.

Kings of Dál Riata

Kings before the Battle of Mag Rath

Kings from Mag Rath to 741

Kings from the 740s onwards

Sources
The main sources for the kings of Dál Riata include:
The Annals of Ulster
The Annals of Tigernach
The Senchus Fer n-Alban
The Synchronisms of Flann Mainistrech of Monasterboice
The Duan Albanach
Adomnán of Iona's Life of Saint Columba
A variety of genealogies for later kings of Alba

Less reliable sources may include:
The Annals of Innisfallen
The Chronicon Scotorum
The Annals of the Four Masters
The Annals of Clonmacnoise

Interpretation of these sources remains problematic. Many entries which appear to refer to Dál Riata lack context, many persons named lack patronyms or other identifying bynames. There are many disagreements among sources. Some entries have been amended and expanded at a later time.

References
For primary sources, see also the articles mentioned above and External links below

 
Adomnán, Life of St Columba, tr. & ed. Richard Sharpe. Penguin, London, 1995. 
Anderson, Alan Orr, Early Sources of Scottish History A.D 500–1286, volume 1. Reprinted with corrections. Paul Watkins, Stamford, 1990. 
Bannerman, John, Studies in the History of Dalriada. Scottish Academic Press, Edinburgh, 1974. 
Bannerman, John, "The Scottish Takeover of Pictland" in Dauvit Broun & Thomas Owen Clancy (eds.) Spes Scotorum: Hope of Scots. Saint Columba, Iona and Scotland. T & T Clark, Edinburgh, 1999. 
Broun, Dauvit, The Irish Identity of the Kingdom of the Scots in the Twelfth and Thirteenth Centuries. Boydell, Woodbridge, 1999. 
Broun, Dauvit, "Pictish Kings 761–839: Integration with Dál Riata or Separate Development" in Sally M. Foster (ed.), The St Andrews Sarcophagus: A Pictish masterpiece and its international connections. Four Courts, Dublin, 1998. 
Sharpe, Richard, "The thriving of Dalriada" in Simon Taylor (ed.), Kings, clerics and chronicles in Scotland 500–1297. Four Courts, Dublin, 2000.

External links
CELT: Corpus of Electronic Texts at University College Cork
The Corpus of Electronic Texts includes the Annals of Ulster, Tigernach, the Four Masters and Innisfallen, the Chronicon Scotorum, the Lebor Bretnach (which includes the Duan Albanach), Genealogies, and various Saints' Lives. Most are translated into English, or translations are in progress
Annals of Clonmacnoise at Cornell

See also
Kings of the Picts
Kings of Strathclyde
Kings of Scots

Dal Riata
Dal Riata Kings
 
Dal Riada